The St. Mary's Covered Bridge, also known as Shade Gap Covered Bridge and Huntingdon County Bridge No. 8, is a historic wooden covered bridge located at Cromwell Township in Huntingdon County, Pennsylvania. It crosses the Shade Creek. It is the only remaining covered bridge in Huntingdon County.

It was listed on the National Register of Historic Places in 1980.

References 

Covered bridges on the National Register of Historic Places in Pennsylvania
Covered bridges in Huntingdon County, Pennsylvania
Bridges completed in 1889
Wooden bridges in Pennsylvania
Bridges in Huntingdon County, Pennsylvania
National Register of Historic Places in Huntingdon County, Pennsylvania
Road bridges on the National Register of Historic Places in Pennsylvania
Howe truss bridges in the United States